The cubic inch (symbol in3) is a unit of volume in the Imperial units and United States customary units systems. It is the volume of a cube with each of its three dimensions (length, width, and height) being one inch long which is equivalent to 1/231 of a US gallon.

The cubic inch and the cubic foot are used as units of volume in the United States, although the common SI units of volume, the liter, milliliter, and cubic meter, are also used, especially in manufacturing and high technology.

One cubic foot is equal to exactly  because 123 = 1,728.

One US gallon is equal to exactly .

Notation conventions
 The following abbreviations have been used to denote the cubic inch: cubic in, cu inch, cu in, cui, cu. in.
 The IEEE standard symbol is: in3
 In internal combustion engines, the following abbreviations are used to denote cubic inch displacement: c.i.d., cid, CID, c.i., ci

Equivalence with other units of volume
One cubic inch (assuming an international inch) is equal to:
  (1 cu ft equals 1,728 cu in)
 Roughly 1 tablespoon (1.0 U.S. gallon = 256 U.S. tablespoons = 231 cubic inches)
 About 
 About 
 About 0.06926407 American/English cups
 About 
 About 
 About  
 About  (1.0 gallon equals 231 cu in exactly [3 in × 7 in × 11 in])
 About  of crude oil (1.0 barrel equals 42 gallons, by definition, or 9,702 cu in)
 Exactly  (1.0 liter is about )
 Exactly  or cubic centimeters (which in turn is approximately )
 Exactly  ( is about )

Uses of the cubic inch

Electrical box volume
The cubic inch was established decades ago in the National Electrical Code as the conventional unit in North America for measuring the volume of electrical boxes. Because of the extensive export of electrical equipment to other countries, some usage of the non-SI unit can be found outside North America.

Engine displacement

North America
The cubic inch was formerly used by the automotive industry and aircraft industry in North America (through the early 1980s) to express the nominal engine displacement for the engines of new automobiles, trucks, aircraft, etc. The cubic inch is still used for this purpose in classic car collecting. The auto industry now uses liters for this purpose, while reciprocating engines used in commercial aircraft often have model numbers based on the cubic inch displacement. The fifth generation Ford Mustang has a Boss 302 version that reflects this heritage - with a five-liter (302 cubic inch) engine similar to the original Boss. Chevrolet has also revived this usage on its 427 Corvette. Dodge has a  "Challenger 392" (a conversion from its 6.4 liter V8 engine).

See also
 Conversion of units
 Orders of magnitude (volume)
 Square inch

References

Customary units of measurement in the United States
Imperial units
Units of volume

ja:インチ#立方インチ